This is the list of the episodes for the American automotive Reality television series Car Warriors, which was produced by BASE Productions and ran for two seasons on Speed in the U.S. and Discovery Communications affiliates in international markets. The series is a car restoration/modification competition in which two teams battle each other to restore and modify their mystery cars for a chance to win them by the end of the episode.

Episodes

Season 1 (2011)
Season 1 of Car Warriors features the All Stars, a team of expert car builders assembled to compete with teams representing their hometown garages. Both teams have 72 hours to restore and modify their mystery cars before they are reviewed by a panel of three judges. If the challenging team wins the contest, they get to take home not only their car, but also the All Stars' car. However, if they lose, they go home empty-handed.

 Episode 8-9 were special challenges that had the clock shortened to 36 hours.

Season 2 (2012)
Season 2 drops the All Stars for a competition between two teams representing their respective hometown garages. The build time has been reduced to 48 hours, while host/judge Jimmy Shine critiques both works. The winning team is handed the keys to their car, while the losing team ends up with nothing.

 Episode 7 is the only time the competitors built a brand new car from the ground up.

References
General

Other

Car Warriors episodes